Boo, sometimes referred to as Saltsjö-Boo, is a locality situated on the island of Värmdö in Sweden's Stockholm archipelago. From an administrative perspective, it is located in Nacka Municipality and Stockholm County, and has 24,052 inhabitants as of 2010.

History 
Boo was an independent municipality until 1970. In 1971 it was integrated into Nacka Municipality.

Sports
The following sports clubs are located in Boo:

 Boo FF
 Boo HK
 Nacka TK

External links
Google Earth view of Boo

References 

Populated places in Nacka Municipality